The national flag of Armenia, the Armenian Tricolour, consists of three horizontal bands of equal width, red on the top, blue in the middle, and  apricot on the bottom. The Armenian Supreme Soviet adopted the current flag on 24 August 1990. On 15 June 2006, the Law on the National Flag of Armenia, governing its usage, was passed by the National Assembly of Armenia.

Throughout history, there have been many variations of the Armenian flag. In ancient times, Armenian dynasties were represented by different symbolic animals displayed on their flags. In the twentieth century, various Soviet flags represented the Armenian SSR.

The meanings of the colors are interpreted in many different ways. The red stands for the Armenian Highlands, the Armenian people's continued struggle for survival, maintenance of the Christian faith and Armenia's independence and freedom. Blue is for the Armenian peaceful skies. And orange represents the nation's talent and hard-work.

Design
In 2012, the Armenian National Institute of Standards (SARM) issued specifications about the construction and colors on the national flag.:

The official definition of the colors, as stated in the Constitution of Armenia, is:

History

Today's tricolor flag bears little resemblance to the earliest Armenian 'flags'. In ancient times, armies went into battle behind carvings mounted on poles. The carvings might represent a dragon, an eagle, a lion or "some mysterious object of the gods". With the advent of Christianity, the Armenian empire adopted many different flags representing various dynasties. The Artaxiad Dynasty's flag, for instance, consisted of a red cloth displaying two eagles gazing at each other, separated by an eight-pointed star which might represent a flower or some mysterious object.

Middle Ages 

During the invasion of the Arabs, despite stronger resistance than even the Persian, Armenia came under control Umayyad Caliphate, and on its territory the Armenian Emirate was created, stretching from modern Baku and Derbent in the east to the sources of the Euphrates in the west and from the Terek River in the north to Lake Urmia in the south. The emirate received a flag, which is a black cloth without any additional elements on it.

In 885, Armenia gained independence and the flag, which is a dark red canvas with the image of a white leopard and a Christian cross on it.
Now the "Ani leopard" from this flag is also an element of the flag and coat of arms of the second largest city and cultural capital of Armenia - the city of Gyumri. Unlike the flags of Greater Armenia, the flag of Armenian Kingdom was not the flag of the ruling dynasty.

In 1080, the Kingdom of Cilicia was founded. For almost four centuries, three royal dynasties have changed there, and each of them changed the country's flag to its own, dynastic one.

19th century

After Armenia was split between the Persian and the Ottoman Empires, the idea of an Armenian flag ceased to exist for some time. The Armenian Catholic priest Father Ghevont Alishan created a new flag for Armenia in 1885, after the Armenian Students Association of Paris requested one for the funeral of the French writer Victor Hugo. Alishan's first design was very similar to today's Armenian flag: a horizontal tricolor. However, it looked more like an upside-down variation of the current flag of Bulgaria. The top band was red, symbolizing the first Sunday of Easter (called "Red" Sunday), followed by a green band to represent the "Green" Sunday of Easter, and finally an arbitrary color, white, was chosen to complete the combination. While in France, Alishan also designed a second flag, identified today as the "Nationalist Armenian Flag". It too was a tricolor, but unlike the previous design, this one was a vertical tricolor similar to the French flag. Its colors were red, green, and blue, from left to right, representing the rainbow that Noah saw after landing on Mount Ararat.

First Republic of Armenia

After gaining independence, the First Republic of Armenia adopted the modern Armenian tricolor. Upon Stepan Malkhasyants's appearance in the Armenian National Council, the independent Armenian government selected the colors used during the Lusignan period: red, blue and yellow. An earlier prototype, which was eventually rejected, was the rainbow flag. This prototype can be seen at the Martiros Saryan House Museum in Yerevan, Armenia. They chose to replace the yellow with orange "because it merged better with the other two colors, presenting a more pleasing composition". The flag of independent Armenia then had a ratio of 2:3, but on 24 August 1990, when the Armenian Supreme Soviet adopted it as the flag of the Republic of Armenia, the ratio was changed to 1:2.

Early Soviet Armenia and the Transcaucasian SFSR

On 29 November 1920 Bolsheviks established the Armenian SSR. An old flag was introduced and fixed in the Constitution, accepted on 2 February 1922 by the First Congress of Soviets of the Armenian SSR. That flag existed only for a month, because on 12 March the Armenian SSR united with the Georgian SSR and the Azerbaijan SSR under the Transcaucasian SFSR (TSFSR). On 30 December 1922 the Transcaucasian SFSR became one of the four Soviet republics that united to form the USSR. The flag of the republic had a hammer and sickle inserted into a star with initials "ЗСФСР" (ZSFSR) written in Russian sans-serif script. These letters stand for Закавказская Советская Федеративная Социалистическая Республика (Zakavkazskaya Sovetskaya Federativnaya Socialisticheskaya Respublika, "Transcaucasian Soviet Federative Socialist Republic"). In 1936, the TSFSR was broken up into its two constituent regions, which were named the Georgian SSR and the Armenian SSR.

Armenian SSR

As a republic of the USSR, the Armenian SSR introduced its first flag in 1936. Very similar to the flag of the Soviet Union, it was red and featured a yellow hammer and sickle in the corner. Underneath that, there were "H-Kh-S-H" initials written in Armenian serif script. These initials, in the Western Armenian language, stand for Haygagan Khorhurtayin Sodzialistakan Hanrabedutyun, or the "Armenian Soviet Socialist Republic".  In the 1940s, the flag was altered to use the Eastern Armenian language spoken in the Republic. The initials were changed to "H-S-S-R" meaning "Hayastani Sovetakan Sotsialistikakan Respublika" in the Eastern Armenian pronunciation. In 1952, a new flag was introduced. The initials were removed completely and in their place a horizontal blue stripe was added.

In late May 1988, amid rising nationalist tensions from glasnost and perestroika, Armenia's new Communist party leader allowed the banned tricolour of the DRA to fly in Yerevan for the first time in over sixty years. A year later, following a Nagorno-Karabakh-themed mass demonstration where the tricolour was flown, he urged its official recognition. This came on 24 August 1990, a day after the Armenian Supreme Soviet declared the republic's sovereignty and renamed the country the Republic of Armenia. At that point, just over a year before Armenia declared its formal independence from the USSR, the tricolour replaced the 1952 flag.

Usage

The 2006 law on the National Flag of Armenia states that the flag has to be raised on the following public buildings:
Residence of the President
Parliament
Government
Constitutional Court
Office of Public Prosecutor
Central Bank of Armenia
Other governmental buildings

The law requires the lowering of the flag to the midpoint of the flagpole on the days of mourning or during mourning ceremonies. A black ribbon needs to be placed at the top of the flag; the length of the ribbon should be equal to the length of the flag. The flying flag has to be raised in its entirety, clean, and unfaded; moreover, the lower part of the flag should be at least 2.5 m off the ground.

National flag days
The day of the National Flag of Armenia is marked on 15 June every year. The day is chosen for the reason that the Armenian law on the National Flag of Armenia was passed on 15 June 2006. The day of the Armenian tricolour was celebrated for the first time on 15 June 2010 in Yerevan.

The daily display of the Armenian flag is encouraged, but legally required only on the following days:

 1 January, 2 JanuaryNew Year
 6 JanuaryChristmas
 8 MarchInternational Women's Day
 7 AprilMotherhood and Beauty Day
 1 MayInternational Worker's Solidarity Day
 9 MayVictory and Peace Day
 28 MayFirst Armenian Republic Day, 1918
 5 JulyConstitution Day, 1995
 21 SeptemberIndependence Day, 1991
 7 DecemberSpitak Earthquake Memorial Day, 1988

Sub-national flags

Municipalities

Influence
The national flag is also mentioned in the song "Mer Hayrenik" (Our Fatherland), the national anthem of Armenia. Specifically, the second and third stanzas sing about the creation of the national flag:

Flag of Artsakh

On 2 June 1992, the Republic of Artsakh, a de facto independent republic in South Caucasus, adopted a flag derived from the flag of Armenia, with only a white pattern added. A white, five-toothed, stepped carpet pattern was added to the flag, beginning at the two verges of the cloth's right side and connecting at a point equal to one-third of the distance from that side. The white pattern symbolizes the current separation of Artsakh from Armenia proper and its aspiration for eventual union with "the Fatherland". This symbolises the Armenian heritage, culture and population of the area and represents Artsakh as being a separated region of Armenia by the triangular shape and the zigzag cutting through the flag. The pattern is also similar to the designs used on rugs. The ratio of the flag's breadth to its length is 1:2, same as the Armenian Tricolor.

Flag of the Pan-Armenian Games
In addition to the flag of Artsakh, the Armenian flag colors influenced the design of the Pan-Armenian Games flag. In the center of the light blue flag are six interlocking rings, derived from the Olympic rings. The sixth, orange-colored ring, interlocks with the blue and red rings, which symbolize Armenia. Above the rings is a flame in the colors of the Armenian flag.

See also

 Coat of arms of Armenia
 List of Armenian flags
 Flag of the Armenian Soviet Socialist Republic

References

External links

 
  VEXILLOGRAPHIA - Флаги Армении
 Armenica.org - Symbolic values and information about the Armenian flag and coat of arms
 Yeraguyn.com - The Flag of the Republic of Armenia (in English, Armenian and Russian)

Armenia
National symbols of Armenia
 
Armenia
Armenia
Armenia
Armenia